Alessandro, Principe Ruspoli (December 3, 1708 – June 20, 1779) was the 2nd Principe di Cerveteri, 2nd Marchese di Riano and 7th Conte di Vignanello, son of Francesco Maria Marescotti Ruspoli, 1st Prince of Cerveteri and wife Isabella Cesi dei Duchi di Acquasparta, maternal niece of Pope Innocent XIII. His brother was Bartolomeo Ruspoli.

Marriages and children 
He married firstly in 1720 as her first husband Virginia Altieri dei Principi di Oriolo (Rome, May 6, 1705 – ?), without issue. The marriage was annulled by the Pope.

He married secondly in 1749 his first cousin Prudenza dei Conti Marescotti-Capizucchi, daughter of his uncle Mario, 1st Conte Marescotti-Capizucchi (1681 – December 23, 1758) and wife Cassandra Sacchetti dei Marchesi di Castel Rigattini, and paternal granddaughter of Alessandro Marescotti, 5th Conte di Vignanello and second wife Prudenza Gabrielli (December 17, 1654 – December 13, 1709), by whom he had six children:

 Donna Marianna dei Principi Ruspoli (ca 1749 – Rome, 1787), unmarried and without issue
 Donna Maria Isabella dei Principi Ruspolii (April 6, 1750 – ?), unmarried and without issue
 Francesco Ruspoli, 3rd Prince of Cerveteri
 Donna Giacinta dei Principi Ruspoli (July 9, 1753 – ?), married Giuseppe Niccolò Spada-Veralli, ?th Principe di Castelviscardo
 Don Bartolomeo dei Principi Ruspoli (1754 – Siena, 1836), unmarried and without issue
 Don Lorenzo dei Principi Ruspoli (October 30, 1755 – 1835), married Camilla Curti (1790–1866), and had a son and a daughter:
 Donna Agnese dei Principi Ruspoli (November 30, 1810 – ?), married ..., Conte Grimaldi
 Don Ippolito dei Principi Ruspoli (March 13, 1817 – February 17, 1886), married Elisabetta dei Marchesi Pepoli dei Conti di Castiglione (June 14, 1829 – October 18, 1892), maternal granddaughter of Joachim Murat and wife Caroline Bonaparte, and had two daughters:
 Donna Letizia dei Principi Ruspoli (Rome, July 13, 1849 – Rome, December 27, 1944), married in Rome, February 6, 1871 Mario Rappini, Marchese di Casteldelfino (Sezze-Delfino, July 29, 1834 – August 19, 1899)
 Donna Giacinta Carolina dei Principi Ruspoli (1861–1862)

See also 
 Ruspoli

External links 
 Alessandro Ruspoli on a genealogical site

1708 births
1779 deaths
Alessandro
Alessandro